Hebeloma spoliatum is a species of mushroom in the family Hymenogastraceae.

spoliatum
Fungi of Europe
Taxa named by Elias Magnus Fries